Brad may refer to:

 Brad (given name), a masculine given name

Places
 Brad, Hunedoara, a city in Hunedoara County, Romania
 Brad, a village in Berești-Bistrița Commune, Bacău County, Romania
 Brad, a village in Filipeni, Bacău, Romania
 Brad, a village in Negri, Bacău, Romania
 Barad, Syria, also spelled "Brad", an ancient village

Rivers
 Brad (Crișul Alb), a tributary of the Crișul Alb in Hunedoara County, Romania
 Brad (Suciu), a tributary of the Suciu in Maramureș County, Romania

Other uses
 Brad (band), American band
 BRAD Insight, media directory
 Brad, various types of nails
 Brad, a brass fastener, a stationery item used for securing multiple sheets of paper together
 Binary radians ("brads"), a measurement of plane angle mapping one whole turn to a 2^n binary value